The 1987 Liège–Bastogne–Liège was the 73rd edition of the Liège–Bastogne–Liège cycle race and was held on 19 April 1987. The race started and finished in Liège. The race was won by Moreno Argentin of the Gewiss–Bianchi team.

General classification

References

1987
1987 in Belgian sport
1987 Super Prestige Pernod International